Bobsleigh at the 1976 Winter Olympics consisted of two events, at Olympic Sliding Centre Innsbruck.  The competition took place between 6 and 14 February 1976.

Medal summary

Medal table

Three countries won medals in Innsbruck, with East Germany sweeping the gold medals.

Events

Participating NOCs

Thirteen nations participated in bobsleigh at the 1976 Games. East Germany made their Olympic bobsleigh debut.

References

External links
Wallechinsky, David and Jaime Loucky (2009). "Bobsleigh". In The Complete Book of the Winter Olympics: 2010 Edition. London: Aurum Press Limited.

 
1976
1976 Winter Olympics events
1976 in bobsleigh